Eric Nam (born November 17, 1988) is an American singer, songwriter, and television personality based in South Korea. Since his debut in 2013, he was named GQ Korea's Man of the Year in 2016, included on Forbes' 30 Under 30 Asia in 2017, and honored as one of YouTube Music's Global Trending Artists on the Rise in 2019.

Early life and education

Eric Nam was born and raised in Atlanta, Georgia. He graduated from Boston College in 2011 with a major in International Studies and a minor in Asian Studies.  Nam accepted a position as a business analyst at Deloitte Consulting in New York City, deferring the opportunity to participate in microfinance initiatives in India. He subsequently decided to pursue a career in entertainment.

Career

2011–2012: Career beginnings 
After a cover Nam posted on YouTube gained media attention, South Korean broadcasting company MBC invited Nam to Seoul to compete on the program Star Audition: Birth of a Great Star 2, a show similar to the music competition television series The X Factor. His final placement within the top five contestants jump-started his career in South Korea.

On September 25, 2012, Nam signed with B2M Entertainment as a solo artist.

2013–2015: Debut with Cloud 9 and hosting

On January 23, 2013, Nam made his debut with the release of his first extended play (EP) Cloud 9 with lead single "Heaven's Door". That year, Nam also joined Arirang TV's interactive show After School Club and its spin-off, The ASC After Show, as MC. He left the program in 2016 to focus on his music career. His appearances on After School Club and MBC's Section TV Entertainment Relay were positively received and helped established Nam as one of the "go-to" personalities for international celebrity interviews in South Korea.

In April 2014, Nam released his first digital single, "우우 (Ooh Ooh)", and performed at the Seoul Jazz Festival alongside artists such as Chris Botti, Damien Rice, Jamie Cullum, Paolo Nutini, and Craig David. That December, Nam released his second digital single, "Melt My Heart".

In February 2015, Nam featured on Amber Liu's song "I Just Wanna" from her EP Beautiful. In March, he released the single "I'm OK" and its accompanying music video. In May, Nam released the single "Dream", featuring 15&'s Park Ji-min, for charity. In December, Nam signed an exclusive contract with CJ E&M.

2016–2017: Interview and first US releases

Nam released his second EP, Interview, with the lead single "Good For You" on March 24, 2016. That same month, he also took part in SM Entertainment's digital music channel SM Station, releasing the duet "Spring Love" with Red Velvet's Wendy. On April 16, Nam hosted and performed on Saturday Night Live Korea, receiving one of the highest ratings of the season. Later that month, Nam joined the virtual marriage show We Got Married with Mamamoo's Solar as his partner.

On June 10, Nam released his first US single, "Into You", a collaboration with electronic band KOLAJ. "Into You" premiered worldwide on Beats 1 Radio and The Fader, charting at a number one on Hype Machine. Later that month, Nam headlined KCON NY 2016 and performed five songs, including "Into You", to a sold-out crowd at Prudential Center. He then released his digital single "Can't Help Myself" in July 2016, with lyrics written by Epik High's Tablo and featuring rapper Loco. Nam also headlined KCON LA 2016 and performed "Can't Help Myself" and "Into You" with KOLAJ to a sold-out Staples Center.

Nam became the host of the new Mnet talk show Yang and Nam Show alongside comedian Yang Se-hyung in November 2016. Additionally, he premiered his collaboration with producer Timbaland, "Body", at the 2016 Mnet Asian Music Awards.

In 2017, Nam collaborated with singer Gallant and rapper Tablo on the single "Cave Me In". The song premiered worldwide on Beats 1 Radio and trended globally on YouTube and Facebook for over 72 hours after its release. The music video was shot in Hong Kong. Nam also featured on Seohyun's "Hello" from her EP Don't Say No and collaborated with Jeon Somi on the single "You, Who?". Furthermore, Nam featured on DJ and record producer Arty's single "Idea of You". Nam performed three sold-out shows in New York City and Atlanta in August 2017 with singer Alec Benjamin as his opening act. The shows sold out in one minute during presale; due to overwhelming demand, Nam added the date in Atlanta and increased the venue size in New York City.

2018: Honestly and North American tour
At the 2018 Winter Olympics in South Korea, Nam was named an Honorary Ambassador. He appeared on the primetime Olympic broadcast of American television network NBC, providing an in-depth look at K-pop with interviewers Johnny Weir and Tara Lipinski.

On April 11, 2018, Nam released his third EP, Honestly. Led by singles "Honestly" and "Potion", the latter of which featured rapper Woodie GoChild and was released ahead of the album on April 9. Honestly leaned into synth and electropop while including some dancehall and reggaeton influences. Nam worked with numerous songwriters on the EP, including Brian Lee, Tablo, and Jake Torrey. Additionally, Nam stated that the members of BTS helped provide him with feedback as he was creating the record. Honestly debuted at number six on the Billboard World Album charts. In June, Nam embarked on the Honestly Tour, which encompassed 15 shows in 14 cities across North America and featured pop duo Loote as special guest. On July 21, Nam performed at We The Fest in Jakarta, Indonesia, the only Korean act in the lineup.

Later that summer, Nam released the song "Float", which he co-wrote with producer Kool Kojak. The song was selected by Sony Pictures for the official soundtrack for the film Hotel Transylvania 3: Summer Vacation, which reached number one at the US box office upon release. Nam also featured on a remix for "Your Side of the Bed" with Loote.

2019–2020: Before We Begin, world tour, and The Other Side 
On May 8, 2019, Nam released the digital single "Runaway". On April 17, he debuted his weekly podcast show, K-Pop Daebak w/ Eric Nam. The show was named "New & Noteworthy" and "Best Listens of 2019" by Apple Podcasts, as well as "Top 10 Music Podcasts" by Spotify in 2019. On November 14, Nam released his first English album Before We Begin, which marked the start of a new sound and "his transition from K-pop star to global pop singer-songwriter." He noted in an interview with Highsnobiety that he felt "much more expressive in English" since he believed that his previous process of translating English lyrics to Korean caused his music to "lose so much of [the] sentiment" he intended to convey. Nam released his second podcast show, I Think You're Dope w/ Eric Nam, on December 10. The show reached number one on the Music Podcast Charts in over 25 countries, including the US, UK, and South Korea.

On January 9, 2020, Nam embarked on his first official world tour, the Before We Begin World Tour. The tour was set to visit 34 cities across Asia, North America, and Latin America; however, in March 2021, Nam announced the cancellation of the final two Los Angeles shows and Latin American leg due to the COVID-19 pandemic. On July 30, 2020, Nam released his fourth Korean EP, The Other Side. In an interview, he described the record as "a little more playful, a little more upbeat, a little brighter" than his previous releases. The title track "The Other Side" and lead single "Paradise" saw success in South Korea and other Asian countries. Day6 vocalist Young K co-wrote four of the songs with Nam.

2021–present: There and Back Again 
On May 21, 2021, Nam released the single "Echo", a collaboration with Indian singer and composer Armaan Malik and Indian-American composer Kshmr. On June 4, it was confirmed that Nam's contract with CJ E&M had expired. On October 15, Nam released the digital single "I Don't Know You Anymore", his first independent release. On October 19, Nam announced his There and Back Again World Tour 2022 and released the digital single "Any Other Way" on November 12.

On January 7, 2022, Nam released his second English album There and Back Again, which included the previously-released singles "I Don't Know You Anymore" and "Any Other Way". Nam commenced the There And Back Again World Tour in Phoenix, on January 24, visiting cities throughout North America, Europe, and the South Pacific. He will embark on an Asia tour extension that includes six cities across Southeast Asia, concluding on November 20 in Seoul.

Nam is set to make his acting debut in the psychological thriller film Transplant.

Discography

 Before We Begin (2019)
 There and Back Again (2022)

Concert tours 
 Honestly Tour (2018–2019)
 Before We Begin World Tour (2020)
 There And Back Again World Tour (2022)

Filmography

Film

Television

Awards and nominations

Listicles

References

External links

1988 births
Living people
American expatriates in South Korea
American male pop singers
American musicians of Korean descent
American contemporary R&B singers
American television hosts
American YouTubers
B2M Entertainment artists
Morrissey College of Arts & Sciences alumni
Korean-language singers of the United States
American K-pop singers
Musicians from Atlanta
South Korean male idols
Uiryeong Nam clan
21st-century American singers
21st-century American male singers
The Lovett School alumni
Peking University alumni
American people of South Korean descent